The 1956 West Virginia gubernatorial election took place on November 6, 1956, to elect the governor of West Virginia.

Results

Results by county

References

External links
 Democratic primary results
 Republican primary results

1956
gubernatorial
West Virginia
November 1956 events in the United States